Benjamin Fung is a Hong Kong-born Canadian computer scientist. Fung holds the positions of Canada Research Chair in Data Mining for Cybersecurity and Full Professor in the School of Information Studies at McGill University. His research focuses on developing data mining and machine learning methods in the areas of cyber security, data privacy, malware analysis, and authorship analysis.

Biography 
Fung was born in Hong Kong in the 1970s. He received his B.Sc. (1999), M.Sc. (2003), and Ph.D. (2007) degrees in computing science from Simon Fraser University in Canada, and his designation of Professional Engineer (P.Eng.) in Ontario in 2009.

Fung joined the McGill University School of Information Studies as an associate professor in 2013, received the title of Canada Research Chair in Data Mining for Cybersecurity in 2015, and promoted to Full Professor in 2020. He is a Senior Member of Association for Computing Machinery (ACM) and Institute of Electrical and Electronics Engineers (IEEE). He is also a Co-curator of Cybersecurity in the World Economic Forum and an Associate Editor for IEEE Transactions of Knowledge and Data Engineering (TKDE) and Elsevier Sustainable Cities and Society (SCS). Before joining McGill, he was an Assistant/Associate Professor in the Concordia Institute for Information Systems Engineering at Concordia University from 2007 to 2013. He worked in SAP BusinessObjects in Vancouver from 1999 to 2003.

Research 
Fung's interdisciplinary research spans across the areas of data mining, machine learning, data privacy, building engineering, and smart cities. His Data Mining and Security Lab (DMaS) developed a collection of privacy-preserving data publishing methods for sharing person-specific data without compromising individual privacy while preserving the information usefulness for data mining and machine learning. Supported by the Defence Research and Development Canada (DRDC) and Natural Sciences and Engineering Research Council (NSERC), his team developed an award-winning assembly code mining system called Kam1n0 for mining patterns and identifying code clones in software and malware binaries. His works in crime investigation and authorship analysis had been reported by CBC, BBC, New York Times and the Toronto Star.

References 

Canadian computer scientists
Academic staff of McGill University
Canada Research Chairs
1970s births
Living people